Kampong Chhnang can refer to:

Kampong Chhnang (city)
Kampong Chhnang province
Kampong Chhnang municipality
Kampong Chhnang commune
Kampong Chhnang Airport